Pierre Joseph "Baro" Ferret (1908–1976) was a gypsy jazz guitarist and composer. He was known by his gypsy nickname "Baro," which meant "Big One" or even "King" in Romany. Through his brother Jean "Matelo" Ferret, Baro met Django Reinhardt, and the two men became both friends and rivals. From 1931, the Ferret brothers, along with their third brother Etienne "Sarane" Ferret, and cousin René "Challain" Ferret, were favorite sidemen of Reinhardt. Baro recorded around 80 sides with Reinhardt. The Ferret brothers played with musicians including Didi Duprat.

Baro retired as a full-time musician during World War II and devoted himself to running bars and to black market businesses during the German occupation of Paris, an activity he continued into the early 1970s.

As a composer, Baro's "valses bebop" were years ahead of the times. His works such as "Panique...!," "La Folle" ("The Madwoman"), "Swing Valse" (written with Belgian-French button accordionist Gus Viseur), and "Le Depart de Zorro" were modernistic, surreal, and dark, part Musette, part modern jazz.

His nephews, Jean "Matelo" Ferret's sons Boulou and Elios Ferré continue to perform gypsy jazz.

References

External links
 
 Pierre (Baro) Ferret at discogs.com

1908 births
1976 deaths
Gypsy jazz guitarists
French male composers
20th-century French composers
Hot Club Records artists
20th-century guitarists
20th-century French male musicians
Male jazz musicians